Kevin Flynn (born 1976) (Irish: Caoimhín Ó Floinn) is a former inter-county hurler for Dublin and former O'Tooles player.

Club
Flynn was named on the Dublin Blue Stars team on seven occasions, most recently in 2007. He won four Dublin Senior Hurling Championship medals with O'Tooles in 2002, 1997, 1996 and 1995 and a Dublin Senior Hurling League in 2006. 

In 2011 he emigrated to Chicago and led Harry Bolands to titles in 2012 & 2013 acting as player/manager.

Inter County
He captained Dublin to their Walsh Cup win over Kilkenny in 2003 and also won two division two National Hurling Leagues, the most recent one in 2006. He has also played Railway Cup for Leinster.

Flynn made his league debut in October 1995 with a win over Limerick in Croke Park. He went on to make his championship debut the following summer when Dublin were defeated by Wexford by five points in the Leinster semi-final.

In 2002 he finished in 8th position in the overall Hurling Top Scorers list. Kevin Flynn was well-known, along with others for always giving generously of his time to autograph hunters and fans after games.

Honours
O'Tooles
 Dublin Senior Hurling Championship: 
 Winners (4): 1995, 1996, 1997, 2002
 Runners-up (1): 2011
 Dublin Senior Hurling League:
Winners (1): 2006

Dublin
National Hurling League Division 2: 
 Winners (2): 1997, 2006
Walsh Cup:
 Winners (1): 2003

Individual
Dublin Blue Stars: 1996, 1997, 2002, 2006, 2007

References

1976 births
Living people
Dublin inter-county hurlers
O'Tooles hurlers
Sportspeople from Belfast